The Nottinghamshire and Derbyshire Mounted Brigade (later numbered as the 7th Mounted Brigade) was a yeomanry brigade of the British Army, formed as part of the Territorial Force in 1908.

It served dismounted in the Gallipoli Campaign before being remounted to serve in the Salonika and Sinai and Palestine Campaigns in the First World War.

In April 1918, it was merged with elements of the 9th (Secunderabad) Cavalry Brigade to form 14th Cavalry Brigade.  It remained in Palestine after the end of the war on occupation duties.

Formation

Under the terms of the Territorial and Reserve Forces Act 1907 (7 Edw.7, c.9), the brigade was formed in 1908 as part of the Territorial Force.  It consisted of three yeomanry regiments, a horse artillery battery and ammunition column, a transport and supply column and a field ambulance.

As the name suggests, the units were drawn from Nottinghamshire and Derbyshire.

First World War

Nottinghamshire and Derbyshire Mounted Brigade
The brigade was embodied on 4 August 1914 upon the outbreak of the First World War.  Initially, it concentrated in Berkshire, and on 5 August 1914, the brigade joined the 1st Mounted Division.  On 2 September, it was transferred to the 2nd Mounted Division, and in mid November 1914, it moved with its division to Norfolk on coastal defence duties.

Egypt
In April 1915, the 2nd Mounted Division moved to Egypt arriving at Alexandria between 19 and 21 April and was posted to Cairo by the middle of May. In May 1915, the brigade was designated 3rd (Nottinghamshire and Derbyshire) Mounted Brigade.

It was dismounted in August 1915 and took part in the Gallipoli Campaign.  Each regiment left a squadron headquarters and two troops (about 100 officers and men) in Egypt to look after the horses.

Gallipoli
The brigade landed at Suvla Bay on the night of 17/18 August and moved into reserve positions at Lala Baba on the night of 20 August. On 21 August, it advanced to Chocolate Hill under heavy fire and took part on the right flank of the attack on Hill 112.

Due to losses during the Battle of Scimitar Hill and wastage during August 1915, the 2nd Mounted Division had to be reorganized. On 4 September 1915, the 2nd Composite Mounted Brigade was formed from the 3rd (Notts and Derby) and 4th (London) Mounted Brigades.  The brigade formed a battalion sized unit 3rd Nottinghamshire and Derbyshire Regiment.  The brigade embarked for Mudros on 2 November and returned to Egypt in December 1915 where it was reformed and remounted.

7th Mounted Brigade

The brigade left the 2nd Mounted Division on 18 and 19 January 1916.  In February 1916, the brigade was sent to take part in the Salonika Campaign.  On 31 March 1916, the remaining Mounted Brigades were numbered in a single sequence.  As a consequence, the Nottinghamshire and Derbyshire Mounted Brigade was redesignated as 7th Mounted Brigade.

The brigade arrived back in Egypt from Salonika on 29 June 1917, less the Derbyshire Yeomanry which remained in Macedonia as GHQ Troops with the British Salonika Army.  20th Machine Gun Squadron then was formed on 4 July 1917 at Ismailia from the machine gun sections of the two regiments.  The brigade served variously as Corps Troops with the Desert Mounted Corps and XXI Corps and on attachment to the Yeomanry Mounted Division.  Essex Battery, RHA joined from 52nd (Lowland) Division on 17 September 1917 and was still assigned to the brigade when it joined the new 2nd Mounted Division.

14th Cavalry Brigade

In March 1918, the 2nd Indian Cavalry Division was broken up in France.  The Canadian (Canadian Cavalry Brigade) and British units (notably 7th Dragoon Guards, 8th Hussars and N and X Batteries RHA) remained in France and the Indian elements were sent to Egypt.

By an Egyptian Expeditionary Force GHQ Order of 12 April 1918, the mounted troops of the EEF were reorganized when the Indian Army units arrived in theatre.  On 24 April 1918, the 2nd Mounted Division was formed on the Indian Establishment, and the 7th Mounted Brigade was assigned to it.

On 24 April 1918, the 7th Mounted Brigade was merged with elements of the 9th (Secunderabad) Cavalry Brigade:
the Sherwood Rangers Yeomanry remained with the brigade
the South Nottinghamshire Hussars left the brigade and was merged with the Warwickshire Yeomanry (of 5th Mounted Brigade) to form B Battalion, Machine Gun Corps.  It was posted to France, arriving in June
20th Deccan Horse joined from 9th (Secunderabad) Cavalry Brigade
34th Prince Albert Victor's Own Poona Horse joined from 9th (Secunderabad) Cavalry Brigade
20th Machine Gun Squadron remained with the brigade
7th Mounted Brigade Signal Troop remained with the brigade
in April, 7th Mounted Brigade Field Ambulance merged with Secunderabad Cavalry Field Ambulance to form 7th Combined Cavalry Field Ambulance
in April, 7th Mounted Brigade Mobile Veterinary Section merged with Secunderabad Mobile Veterinary Section to form 7th Cavalry Mobile Veterinary Section
On 22 July 1918, the 2nd Mounted Division was renumbered as the 5th Cavalry Division and the brigade as 14th Cavalry Brigade.  The sub units (Signal Troop, Combined Cavalry Field Ambulance and Mobile Veterinary Section) were renumbered on the same date.

The brigade remained with 5th Cavalry Division for the rest of the war, taking part in the Affair of Abu Tellul, Battle of Megiddo, Capture of Damascus, and Occupation of Aleppo.

After the Armistice of Mudros, the brigade remained with 5th Cavalry Division in Palestine as part of the occupation forces.  However, demobilization began immediately and the brigade was broken up in September 1919.

Commanders
The Nottinghamshire and Derbyshire Mounted Brigade / 7th Mounted Brigade / 14th Cavalry Brigade had the following commanders:

See also

 2/1st Nottinghamshire and Derbyshire Mounted Brigade for the 2nd Line formation
 British yeomanry during the First World War

Notes

References

Bibliography
 

 
 
 
 
 
 

CB14
Cavalry brigades of the British Indian Army
Military units and formations established in 1908
Military units and formations disestablished in 1919
1908 establishments in India